WMUV (100.7 FM) is a commercial Christian radio station that broadcasts to the Jacksonville, Florida area.  The station is licensed in Brunswick, Georgia to Chesapeake-Portsmouth Broadcasting Corporation and is owned by Nancy Epperson. It is branded as The Promise and broadcasts Christian adult contemporary music. Studios are on Bonneval Road in the Southside district of Jacksonville, and the transmitter tower is in Kingsland, Georgia.

History
WMUV, whose transmitting tower is in Georgia near the Florida border, began targeting the Jacksonville area in 1965 as WIOI-FM.  On June 3, 1991 it became WOKV-FM.  The station later began airing Christian radio programming as WBYB (1993–1995), classic rock as both WWRD (1995–1996) and WWRR "Arrow 100.7" (1996–2005), and oldies as WKQL "Kool 100.7" (2005–2006). On October 20, 2006, WKQL became the eighth station in the United States to adopt the rhythmic hot AC MOViN' format.

On February 18, 2009, at 10 a.m., the rhythmic format was dropped and the station switched to Classic Country as "Country Legends 100.7". On the morning of February 23, 2013, WMUV segued from Classic Country to mainstream country, as "Country 100.7". On April 18, 2013, WMUV rebranded as "100.7 The Bull" and shifted its focus towards Southern Georgia.  Although no longer an exclusively classic country station, the station still featured a heavy (largely 1990s) gold base to its playlist.

On January 3, 2015, after being acquired by Chesapeake-Portsmouth Broadcasting, WMUV and sister station WSOS-FM flipped to Christian AC as "The Promise".  On April 5, 2016, WSOS-FM flipped to a simulcast of WBOB Jacksonville.

References

External links
 News Release From Renda Broadcasting on format change
 

MUV
Radio stations established in 1965
MUV